Alange is a municipality located in the province of Badajoz, Extremadura, Spain.  the municipality has a population of 1,891 inhabitants.

There has been a spa at Alange at least since Roman times when a bathhouse was constructed with separate facilities for men and women.

There is a medieval castle (but of Roman origins), located on a hill commanding the Matachel river. It was held by the Order of Santiago from the 1240s, and was abandoned in 1550.

References

Municipalities in the Province of Badajoz